The Gazette of India is a public journal and an authorised legal document of the Government of India, published weekly by the Department of Publication, Ministry of Housing and Urban Affairs. The gazette is printed by the Government of India Press.

As a public journal, the Gazette prints official notices from the government. Publishing information in the Gazette is a legal necessity by which official documents come into force and enter the public domain.

Ordinary gazettes are regularly published weekly on a particular day of the week whereas extraordinary gazettes are published every day depending upon the urgency of the matters to be notified.

Publication
The publication of gazette is executed as per the government of India (allocation of business rules) issued from time to time by the cabinet secretariat.

The Department of Publication is headed by the controller of publications with the assistance of two assistant controllers, one financial officer and an assistant director. The gazette employs more than 270 people under the supervision of the Ministry of Urban Development, headquartered in Nirman Bhawan, New Delhi.

Controller of publication is the authorized publisher, custodian and seller of Government of India Publications and periodicals including Gazette of India and Delhi Gazette with its copyright. It undertakes storage, sale and distribution of all saleable publications brought out by various Ministries/Departments.

The Ministry of Urban Development began publishing an electronic version of the gazette in 2008.

See also 
Gazette
List of government gazettes

References

External links

The eGazette of India by National Informatics Centre, Government of India (www.egazette.nic.in)
Department of Publication – Overview

India, Gazette of
Law of India